Dactylurina staudingeri, also known by its common name West African slender-stingless bee is a species from the genus Dactylurina. The species was first described in 1893 by Giovanni Gribodo.

References

Meliponini
Taxa named by Giovanni Gribodo